Brigadier-General John Sanctuary Nicholson  (19 May 1863 – 21 February 1924) was a British Army officer and politician. He was a Conservative Member of Parliament (MP) from 1921 to 1924.

Early life and education 
Born in Kensington, London, the son of William Nicholson and his wife Isabella. He was educated at Harrow and then, in 1882, the Royal Military College at Sandhurst. He was commissioned in 7th Hussars in February 1884 and in 1886 he spent eight years in India with his regiment before in 1894 being sent to Natal.

BSAP, Second Boer War and First World War 
The 7th Hussars joined a force at Mafeking to suppress a native rising in Matabeleland. During these operations he raised and commanded a corps of British South Africa Police (BSAP). He became Commandant-General of the BSAP and Inspector-General of Volunteers in Rhodesia from 1898 until 1903. The Second Boer War took place in neighbouring South Africa from 1899 to June 1902, and to recognize his contribution, Nicholson was appointed a Companion of the Order of the Bath (CB) in the South Africa honours list published on 26 June 1902. In 1903 he succeeded Baden-Powell as Inspector-General of South African Constabulary and retired from the post as a colonel in 1907.

During the First World War he joined the British Expeditionary Force and from April 1915 to December 1918 was base commandant at Calais. He had been promoted to brigadier-general in 1916 and retired from the Army in 1920.

Political career 
With a father and brother both being members of parliament Nicholson contested a seat in East Dorset in the 1910 general election. He lost by 426 votes to Captain Guest but after a petition Guest was unseated. Nicholson stood again as a Conservative candidate in a by-election against Guests brother Henry Guest but was defeated again by a small margin. In the second general election of 1910 in December, he tried to get elected at Stafford but was defeated by 755 votes.

In 1921, he was elected the Member of Parliament for the Westminster Abbey constituency in a by-election following the death of the incumbent MP William Burdett-Coutts. He was re-elected in the following two general elections in 1922 and 1923.

Death 
Nicholson, who had never married, died on 21 February 1924 of pneumonia at his house at South Audley Street, Mayfair aged 60. A by-election was held to replace him as an MP.

References

Who's Who of British Members of Parliament: Volume III 1919-1945, edited by M. Stenton and S. Lees (The Harvester Press 1976)

External links 
 

1863 births
1924 deaths
British Army generals
Military personnel from London
Conservative Party (UK) MPs for English constituencies
Commanders of the Order of the British Empire
Companions of the Distinguished Service Order
Companions of the Order of St Michael and St George
Companions of the Order of the Bath
Deaths from pneumonia in England
People educated at Harrow School
People of the Second Matabele War
Graduates of the Royal Military College, Sandhurst
UK MPs 1918–1922
UK MPs 1922–1923
UK MPs 1923–1924
7th Queen's Own Hussars officers
British military personnel of the Second Boer War
British Army cavalry generals of World War I
British South Africa Police officers